Toyota Motor Corporation's V family of engines were a longitudinally-mounted V8 engine design. They were used from the 1960s through 1997. The V family engine was used in the prestigious Toyota Century. Toyota had worked with Yamaha to produce the first Japanese full aluminum alloy block engine. The V family is often referred to as the "Toyota Hemi" as the engine features a cylinder head design with approximately hemispherical combustion chambers.

The V  engine was first used in the Crown Eight from 1964 to 1967 as part of the second generation Crown range. Thereafter the Crown Eight was replaced by the upmarket Toyota Century.

The 3V, 4V and 5V engines were used in the Toyota Century up until 1997, when it got a complete redesign and replaced the V8 for the 5.0 L 1GZ-FE V12.

The V series engines, like several Toyota Motor Corporation engines (e.g. 2T-C, 2M, 4M etc.) at the time had a hemispherical combustion chamber. The position of the spark plugs, like the 2T-C and Chrysler's Hemi, were located on the top of the head.

References

V
V8 engines